"The Vampyre" is a short work of prose fiction written in 1819 by John William Polidori taken from the story Lord Byron told as part of a contest among Polidori, Mary Shelley, Lord Byron, and Percy Shelley. The same contest produced the novel Frankenstein; or, The Modern Prometheus.  The Vampyre                                                                                                                                    is often viewed as the progenitor of the romantic vampire genre of fantasy fiction. The work is described by Christopher Frayling as "the first story successfully to fuse the disparate elements of vampirism into a coherent literary genre."

Characters
 Lord Ruthven: a suave British nobleman, the vampire
 Aubrey: a wealthy young gentleman, an orphan
 Ianthe: a beautiful Greek woman Aubrey meets on his journeys with Ruthven
 Aubrey's sister: who becomes engaged to the Earl of Marsden
 Earl of Marsden: who is also Lord Ruthven

Plot
Aubrey meets the mysterious Lord Ruthven at a social event when he comes to London. After briefly getting to know Ruthven, Aubrey agrees to go travelling around Europe with him, but leaves him shortly after they reach Rome when he learns that Ruthven seduced the daughter of a mutual acquaintance. Alone, he travels to Greece where he falls in love with an innkeeper's daughter, Ianthe. She tells him about the legends of the vampire, which are very popular in the area.

This romance is short-lived as Ianthe is unfortunately killed, found with her throat torn open. The whole town believes it to be the work of the evil vampire. Aubrey does not make the connection that this coincidentally happens shortly after Lord Ruthven comes to the area. Aubrey makes up with him and rejoins him in his travels, which becomes his undoing. The pair are attacked by bandits on the road and Ruthven is mortally wounded. On his deathbed, Ruthven makes Aubrey swear an oath that he will not speak of Ruthven or his death for a year and a day, and once Aubrey agrees, Lord Ruthven dies laughing.

Aubrey returns to London and is amazed when Ruthven appears shortly thereafter, alive and well and living under a new identity. Ruthven reminds Aubrey of his oath and then begins to seduce Aubrey's sister. Helpless to protect his sister, Aubrey has a nervous breakdown. Upon recovering, Aubrey learns that Ruthven is engaged to his sister, and they are due to be married on the day his oath will end. He writes a letter to his sister explaining everything in case something happens to him before he can warn her in person. Aubrey does in fact die, and his letter does not arrive in time. Ruthven marries Aubrey's sister, and kills her on their wedding night, found drained of blood with Ruthven long gone into the night.

Publication

"The Vampyre" was first published on 1 April 1819 by Henry Colburn in the New Monthly Magazine with the false attribution "A Tale by Lord Byron". The name of the work's protagonist, "Lord Ruthven", added to this assumption, for that name was originally used in Lady Caroline Lamb's novel Glenarvon (from the same publisher), in which a thinly-disguised Byron figure was named Clarence de Ruthven, Earl of Glenarvon. Despite repeated denials by Byron and Polidori, the authorship often went unclarified. In the following issue, dated May 1, 1819, Polidori wrote a letter to the editor explaining "that though the groundwork is certainly Lord Byron's, its development is mine".

The tale was first published in book form by Sherwood, Neely, and Jones in London, Paternoster-Row, in 1819 in octavo as The Vampyre; A Tale in 84 pages. The notation on the cover noted that it was: "Entered at Stationers' Hall, March 27, 1819". Initially, the author was given as Lord Byron. Later printings removed Byron's name and added Polidori's name to the title page.

The story was an immediate popular success, partly because of the Byron attribution and partly because it exploited the gothic horror predilections of the public. Polidori transformed the vampire from a character in folklore into the form that is recognized today—an aristocratic fiend who preys among high society.

The story has its genesis in the summer of 1816, the Year Without a Summer, when Europe and parts of North America underwent a severe climate abnormality. Lord Byron and his young physician John Polidori were staying at the Villa Diodati by Lake Geneva and were visited by Percy Bysshe Shelley, Mary Shelley, and Claire Clairmont. Kept indoors by the "incessant rain" of that "wet, ungenial summer", over three days in June the five turned to telling fantastical tales, and then writing their own. Fueled by ghost stories such as the Fantasmagoriana, William Beckford's Vathek, and quantities of laudanum, Mary Shelley produced what would become Frankenstein, or The Modern Prometheus. Polidori was inspired by a fragmentary story of Byron's, "Fragment of a Novel" (1816), also known as "A Fragment" and "The Burial: A Fragment", and in "two or three idle mornings" produced "The Vampyre".

Influence
Polidori's work had an immense impact on contemporary sensibilities and ran through numerous editions and translations. That influence has extended into the current era as the text is seen as "canonical" and – together with Bram Stoker's Dracula and others – is "often even cited as almost folkloric sources on vampirism". An adaptation appeared in 1820 with Cyprien Bérard's novel Lord Ruthwen ou les Vampires, falsely attributed to Charles Nodier, who himself then wrote his own dramatic version, Le Vampire, a play which had enormous success and sparked a "vampire craze" across Europe. This includes operatic adaptations by Heinrich Marschner (see Der Vampyr) and Peter Josef von Lindpaintner (see Der Vampyr), both published in the same year. Nikolai Gogol, Alexandre Dumas and Aleksey Tolstoy all produced vampire tales, and themes in Polidori's tale would continue to influence Bram Stoker's Dracula and eventually the whole vampire genre. Dumas makes explicit reference to Lord Ruthven in The Count of Monte Cristo, going so far as to state that his character "The Comtesse G..." had been personally acquainted with Lord Ruthven.

In Kim Newman's Anno Dracula series, Lord Ruthven is a prominent character. In the Anno Dracula universe he becomes a prominent figure in British politics following the ascent of Dracula to power. He is a Conservative Prime Minister in the period of the first novel and continues to hold power throughout the 19th century. Described as the "Great Political Survivor", as of 1991 he succeeds Margaret Thatcher as Prime Minister (opposed to John Major).

In 1819, The Black Vampyre, an American novella by Uriah D’Arcy, was published, taking advantage of The Vampyre’s popularity.

Film adaptation

In 2016 it was announced that the studio Britannia Pictures would be releasing a feature-length adaptation of The Vampyre. Production for the film was slated to begin in late 2018, with filming taking place in the UK, Italy and Greece. The film would be directed by Rowan M. Ashe and was scheduled for release in October 2019.

Earlier adaptations of Polidori's story include the 1945 film The Vampire's Ghost starring John Abbott as the Lord Ruthven character "Webb Fallon", with the setting changed from England and Greece to Africa. Also, The Vampyr: A Soap Opera, based on the opera Der Vampyr by Heinrich Marschner and the Polidori story, was filmed and broadcast on BBC 2 on December 2, 1992, with the Lord Ruthven character's name changed to "Ripley", who is frozen in the late eighteenth century but revives in modern times and becomes a successful businessman.

Theatrical adaptations
In England, James Planché's play The Vampire, or The Bride of the Isles was first performed in London in 1820 at the Lyceum Theatre based on Charles Nodier's Le Vampire, which in turn was based on Polidori.  Such melodramas were satirised in Ruddigore, by Gilbert and Sullivan (1887), a character called Sir Ruthven must abduct a maiden, or he will die.

In 1988, American playwright Tim Kelly created a drawing room adaptation of The Vampyre for the stage, popular among community theaters and high school drama clubs.

References

External links

 
 Open Library. The Vampyre (1819).
 e-Book text of Byron's fragmentary story, "Fragment of a Novel" (1816) and Polidori's The Vampyre
 Goreau, Angeline. "Physician, Behave Thyself" The New York Times, September 3, 1989. A review of the novel Lord Byron's Doctor by Paul West, which describes the famed night.
 Baldini, Cajsa C. (Ed.). "The Vampyre 1816 Multimedia Project" Arizona State University, Spring 2010.

1819 short stories
British short stories
Horror short stories
Vampires in written fiction
Gothic short stories
Short stories adapted into films
Works originally published in The New Monthly Magazine
Short stories set in Greece
Short stories set in London